Men is a 1924 American silent drama film directed by Dimitri Buchowetzki and starring Pola Negri that was produced by Famous Players-Lasky and distributed by Paramount Pictures.

The film was Negri's fifth feature for Paramount since coming to the United States in 1923.

Plot
As described in a film magazine review, Cleo, a waitress in a cheap Marseilles cafe, is lured to Paris by a procurer in the white slave business and there is betrayed by a nobleman. The following day, while grieving over her experience, she is accosted by Georges Kleber, whom  she repulses. Years pass, and she becomes a famous dancer and fascinates the banker Henri Duval, but spurns his love. Georges again appears, and this time is favorably received by her, but laughed at when he discloses his passion for her. He steals money from Duval's bank, where he is employed, and gives it to Cleo. Threatened with arrest, Georges is saved when Cleo, who now loves him, offers herself to Duval in payment. However, Duval relents and allows the lovers to be together.

Cast

Preservation status
With no copies of Men located in any film archives, it is a lost film.

See also
List of lost films

References

External links

Lobby card for Men

1924 films
Lost American films
American silent feature films
1924 drama films
Silent American drama films
Famous Players-Lasky films
Films directed by Dimitri Buchowetzki
American black-and-white films
1924 lost films
Lost drama films
1920s American films